Lisicji Jarak Cricket Ground is a cricket ground in Belgrade, Serbia. In July 2022, the venue hosted the Twenty20 International (T20I) matches, between Serbia and Bulgaria.

References

Sport in Serbia